The Florida Cracker or Florida Scrub is an American breed of cattle which originated in Spanish Florida and later in the American state of Florida. It is named for the Florida cracker culture in which it was kept. It is one of the Criollo breeds that descend from the Spanish cattle originally brought to the Americas by the Spanish Conquistadors; among the other North American breeds in this group are the Pineywoods, the Corriente and Texas Longhorn. Unlike the Pineywoods – to which it is closely related – the Florida  Cracker has not been inter-bred with breeds of North European origin.

History 

The Florida Cracker, like other Criollo cattle, derives from cattle brought by the Conquistadores from Spain to the Americas from 1493 onwards; these numbered no more than 300 head in all, and were brought to Hispaniola and other Caribbean islands. Cattle from Cuba were landed in Spanish Florida in 1565, and there was another shipment from the same source in 1640. These were triple-purpose cattle, reared for meat, for milk and for draft work. They were managed extensively, living in semi-feral conditions for much of the time.

After 1949 the combination of new laws about free-roaming livestock and the introduction of larger beef breeds led to the rapid decline of the Florida Cracker. Despite the continued work of the Florida state government and a breed association, the breed is still listed as "critical" by The Livestock Conservancy, and is listed on Ark of Taste of the Slow Food Foundation. In 2018 it was named the official state heritage cattle breed.

Characteristics

Florida Cracker cows are one of the oldest and rarest breeds of cattle in United States. Descended from Spanish stock imported to the continent in the sixteenth century, Florida Crackers cows are a small, horned breed that quickly adapted to the Florida landscape and have long been prized for their resistance to parasites and other hardy traits. They weigh generally under 900 pounds (400 kg), come in many colors, and both males and females are horned.

References 

Cattle breeds originating in the United States
Cattle breeds
Cattle landraces
Conservation Priority Breeds of the Livestock Conservancy
Florida cracker culture
Symbols of Florida